Norway Lake is an unincorporated community in Arctander Township, Kandiyohi County, Minnesota, United States.

Notes

Unincorporated communities in Kandiyohi County, Minnesota
Unincorporated communities in Minnesota